WCMP may refer to:

 World Congress of Muslim Philanthropists, an association that help Islamic donors organize contributions to humanitarian causes.
 WCMP (AM), a radio station (1350 AM) licensed to Pine City, Minnesota, United States
 WCMP-FM, a radio station (100.9 FM) licensed to Pine City, Minnesota, United States